Steven Icke  (born 7 March 1956) is a former Australian rules footballer who played for North Melbourne and Melbourne in the Victorian Football League (VFL).

Originally from Federal Football League club Noble Park, Icke was a versatile player, usually seen at half forward or half back. He was a premiership player with North Melbourne in 1977 and at the end of the 1981 season moved to the Melbourne Demons. In his debut season he won the Keith 'Bluey' Truscott Medal for Melbourne's best and fairest player. His career was shortened after snapping his Achilles tendon on an exposed sprinkler box at VFL Park in 1983, followed by a knee reconstruction three years later. 

Icke served as the General Manager of Football Operations at the Carlton Football Club between March 2007 and September 2011. He was then replaced by Andrew McKay in the position.

Playing statistics

|- style="background-color: #EAEAEA"
! scope="row" style="text-align:center" | 1975
|style="text-align:center;"|
| 36 || 8 || 6 || 12 || 49 || 19 || 68 || 15 ||  || 0.8 || 1.5 || 6.1 || 2.4 || 8.5 || 1.9 || 
|-
! scope="row" style="text-align:center" | 1976
|style="text-align:center;"|
| 36 || 20 || 6 || 5 || 212 || 60 || 272 || 71 ||  || 0.3 || 0.3 || 10.6 || 3.0 || 13.6 || 3.6 || 
|- style="background:#eaeaea;"
! scope="row" style="text-align:center" | 1977
|style="text-align:center;"|
| 36 || 26 || 9 || 13 || 356 || 89 || 445 || 97 ||  || 0.3 || 0.5 || 13.7 || 3.4 || 17.1 || 3.7 || 
|-
! scope="row" style="text-align:center" | 1978
|style="text-align:center;"|
| 36 || 16 || 4 || 3 || 198 || 101 || 299 || 64 ||  || 0.3 || 0.2 || 12.4 || 6.3 || 18.7 || 4.0 || 
|- style="background:#eaeaea;"
! scope="row" style="text-align:center" | 1979
|style="text-align:center;"|
| 36 || 20 || 4 || 3 || 208 || 128 || 336 || 68 ||  || 0.2 || 0.2 || 10.4 || 6.4 || 16.8 || 3.4 || 
|-
! scope="row" style="text-align:center" | 1980
|style="text-align:center;"|
| 36 || 22 || 3 || 5 || 231 || 168 || 399 || 76 ||  || 0.1 || 0.2 || 10.5 || 7.6 || 18.1 || 3.5 || 
|- style="background:#eaeaea;"
! scope="row" style="text-align:center" | 1981
|style="text-align:center;"|
| 36 || 8 || 1 || 1 || 58 || 49 || 107 || 20 ||  || 0.1 || 0.1 || 7.3 || 6.1 || 13.4 || 2.5 || 
|-
! scope="row" style="text-align:center" | 1982
|style="text-align:center;"|
| 11 || 21 || 2 || 4 || 173 || 263 || 436 || 73 ||  || 0.1 || 0.2 || 8.2 || 12.5 || 20.8 || 3.5 || 
|-style="background:#eaeaea;"
! scope="row" style="text-align:center" | 1983
|style="text-align:center;"|
| 11 || 21 || 12 || 7 || 213 || 189 || 402 || 102 ||  || 0.6 || 0.3 || 10.1 || 9.0 || 19.1 || 4.9 || 
|-
! scope="row" style="text-align:center" | 1984
|style="text-align:center;"|
| 11 || 19 || 1 || 3 || 155 || 158 || 313 || 76 ||  || 0.1 || 0.2 || 8.2 || 8.3 || 16.5 || 4.0 || 
|-style="background:#eaeaea;"
! scope="row" style="text-align:center" | 1985
|style="text-align:center;"|
| 11 || 15 || 0 || 3 || 115 || 108 || 223 || 46 ||  || 0.0 || 0.2 || 7.7 || 7.2 || 14.9 || 3.1 || 
|-
! scope="row" style="text-align:center" | 1986
|style="text-align:center;"|
| 11 || 2 || 2 || 0 || 8 || 7 || 15 || 4 || 1 || 2.0 || 0.0 || 4.0 || 3.5 || 7.5 || 2.0 || 0.5
|- class="sortbottom"
! colspan=3| Career
! 198
! 50
! 59
! 1976
! 1339
! 3315
! 712
! 1
! 0.2
! 0.3
! 10.0
! 6.8
! 16.7
! 3.6
! 
|}

References

External links

Demon Wiki profile

1956 births
Living people
Melbourne Football Club players
North Melbourne Football Club players
North Melbourne Football Club Premiership players
Keith 'Bluey' Truscott Trophy winners
Australian rules footballers from Victoria (Australia)
Victorian State of Origin players
One-time VFL/AFL Premiership players